The Serengeti is a breed of domestic cat, first developed by crossing a Bengal (domestic and wild hybrid) and an Oriental Shorthair. Recognized and registered by The International Cat Association (TICA), no other first generation crosses can be registered as Serengeti. From the Bengal × Oriental cross came the first foundation Serengeti. Breeders then worked with the cat to produce a cat that resembles the breed profile set by TICA.
Created by biologist Karen Sausman of Kingsmark Cattery in California in 1994, the breed is still in the development stages, but the ultimate aim is to produce a cat that looks similar to a serval, without using any recent wild cat blood. (Bengal cats originate from hybridization of leopard cats and domestic cats. Most Bengal cats used in Serengeti breeding programs are many generations removed from these origins and possess few genetic contributions of the wild forebears except alleles affecting coat color.)
Serengetis are spotted cats, with long legs and very large, round tipped ears. They have a long neck which blends with the base of the skull without tapering. They are recognized by TICA in tabby, ebony silver, ebony smoke and solid black.

The tabby is known as the brown-spotted in the UK. However spots can be black or dark brown on a tan, light beige or gold background. The silver has black spots on a silver background. Ghost spotting can sometimes be seen on the solid black version.

See also
Chausie, a breed of cat hybridized with jungle cat
Savannah, a breed which integrates the serval's genes

References

External links
The International Serengeti Cat Club
Further information about Serengetis

Cat breeds
Domestic–wild hybrid cats
Cat breeds originating in the United States
Experimental cat breeds